A prefecture (from the Latin praefectura) is an administrative jurisdiction traditionally governed by an appointed prefect. This can be a regional or local government subdivision in various countries, or a subdivision in certain international church structures, as well as in antiquity a Roman district.

Literal prefectures

Antiquity
Prefecture originally refers to a self-governing body or area since the tetrarchy, when Emperor Diocletian divided the Roman Empire into four districts (each divided into dioceses), grouped under a Vicarius (a number of Roman provinces, listed under that article), although he maintained two pretorian prefectures as an administrative level above the also surviving dioceses (a few of which were split).

Ecclesiastic

As canon law is strongly inspired by Roman law, it is not surprising that the Catholic Church has several offices under a prefect. That term occurs also in otherwise styled offices, such as the head of a congregation or department of the Roman Curia. Various ecclesiastical areas, too small for a diocese, are termed prefects.

Analogous prefectures

Brazilian equivalent of prefecture
In Brazil, the prefecture (prefeitura or prefeitura municipal in Portuguese) is the executive branch of the government of each Brazilian municipality (município in Portuguese). The term also refers to the office of the mayor (prefeito in Portuguese).

Central African Republic

The Central African Republic is divided into sixteen prefectures.

Greek equivalent of prefecture

From 1836 until 2011, modern Greece was divided into  (singular) which formed the country's main administrative units. These are most commonly translated into English as "prefectures" or "counties".

Each  was headed by a prefect, who was a ministerial appointee until ca. 1990, but was then elected by direct popular vote in a process of decentralization that saw the prefectures become local government units. Municipal elections in Greece are held every four years and voting for the election of prefects and mayors was carried out concurrently but with separate ballots.

The 2010 Kallikratis plan, which took effect on 1 January 2011, abolished the prefectures as separate administrative units, and transformed them into regional units within the country's thirteen administrative regions.

Chinese equivalents of prefecture

The ancient sense
Xian

When used in the context of Chinese history, especially China before the Tang Dynasty, the word "prefecture" is used to translate xian. This unit of administration is translated as "county" when used in a contemporary context, because of the increase of the number of "xian" and the decrease of  their sizes over time in the Chinese history.

Zhou or Fu 

In the context of Chinese history during or after the Tang Dynasty, the word "prefecture" is used to translate zhou (Wade–Giles chou, another ancient unit of administration in China, equivalent to the modern province.

The modern sense 
In modern-day China, the prefecture is an administrative division found in the second level of the administrative hierarchy. In addition to prefectures, this level also includes autonomous prefectures, leagues, and prefecture-level cities. The prefecture level comes under the province level, and in turn oversees the county level.

Italian prefettura
In Italy a prefettura is the office of a prefetto, the representative of the Government in each province.

French préfecture

In France, a préfecture is the capital city of a department, and by metonymy also designates the office and residence of the prefect. As there are 101 departments in France, there are 101 prefectures. A préfecture de région is the capital city of an administrative region. This is the city where the prefect - the appointed government representative - resides.

Japanese sense of prefecture

They consist of 43 prefectures (県 ken) proper, two urban prefectures (府 fu, Osaka and Kyoto), one "circuit" or "territory" (道 dō, Hokkaido) and one "metropolis" (都 to, Tokyo). Before the end of World War II, the word was also used for overseas areas 庁 (chō)、州 (shu) and 道 (dō, in Korea).

Korean equivalents of prefecture
Until 1894  was the lowest level administrative division in Korea and can be translated into "Petty Prefecture" in the modern sense. It was below  ("county") in the administrative hierarchy.

 was a higher level administrative division and can be translated into "Protectorate General", "Greater Prefecture", "Metropolitan Prefecture", or "Martial Prefecture" in the modern sense. The capital, Hanyang (Seoul), can sometimes be translated as "Hanseong Prefecture".

In 1895,  and  divisions were abolished. From 1910 to 1949, the term "prefecture" was used to translate . Since 1949 neither  nor  have been used, and there has been no division in either the South Korean or North Korean administrative system which translates as "prefecture".

Mongolian equivalent
Mongolian prefectures (Aimags) were adopted during Qing Dynasty's rule. Today these are usually translated as "provinces".

Moroccan Préfecture

In Morocco, the 75 second-level administrative subdivisions are 13 prefectures  and 62 provinces. They are subdivisions of the 12 regions of Morocco. Each prefecture and province are subdivided in their turn into districts (cercles, sing. cercle), municipalities (communes, sing. commune) or urban municipalities (communes urbaines, sing. commune urbaine), and arrondissements in some metropolitan areas.

Romanian prefectură

Venezuelan equivalent
Traditionally the prefecture as being the City Hall and the prefect as being the equivalent of a mayor and commissioner until recently; now the prefectures and prefect are analogous with the figure of Town Clerk.

See also

Apostolic prefecture
County
Prefectures of China
Politics of the People's Republic of China
Prefectures of Japan
Politics of Japan
Politics of the Republic of China
Politics of Mongolia
Province
Subprefecture

Types of administrative division